Syed Misbahuddin Hussain was a Member of the 2nd National Assembly of Pakistan as a representative of East Pakistan.

Career
Hussain was a Member of the 2nd National Assembly of Pakistan. He spoke in the assembly against the lack of representation of Bengalis in the Armed forces of Pakistan. He believed it was a "short sighted policy" that would bring "ruin" to Pakistan.

References

Pakistani MNAs 1955–1958
Possibly living people
People of East Pakistan